Pentila subfuscata is a butterfly in the family Lycaenidae. It is found in Kasai and Lualaba in the Democratic Republic of the Congo.

References

Butterflies described in 1933
Poritiinae
Endemic fauna of the Democratic Republic of the Congo
Butterflies of Africa